The quantified self refers both to the cultural phenomenon of self-tracking with technology and to a community of users and makers of self-tracking tools who share an interest in "self-knowledge through numbers". Quantified self practices overlap with the practice of lifelogging and other trends that incorporate technology and data acquisition into daily life, often with the goal of improving physical, mental, and emotional performance. The widespread adoption in recent years of wearable fitness and sleep trackers such as the Fitbit or the Apple Watch, combined with the increased presence of Internet of things in healthcare and in exercise equipment, have made self-tracking accessible to a large segment of the population.

Other terms for using self-tracking data to improve daily functioning are auto-analytics, body hacking, self-quantifying, self-surveillance, sousveillance (recording of personal activity), and personal informatics.

History
According to Riphagen et al., the history of the quantimetric self-tracking using wearable computers began in the 1970s:
"The history of self-tracking using wearable sensors in combination with wearable computing and 
wireless communication already exists for many years, and also appeared, in the form of sousveillance back in the 1970s [13, 12]"

Quantimetric self-sensing was proposed for the use of wearable computers to automatically sense and measure exercise and dietary intake in 2002:
"Sensors that measure biological signals, ... a personal data recorder that records ... Lifelong videocapture together with blood-sugar levels, ... correlate blood-sugar levels with activities such as eating, by capturing a food record of intake."See also: 

The "quantified self" or "self-tracking" are contemporary labels. They reflect the broader trend of the progressions for organization and meaning-making in human history; there has been a use of self-taken measurements and data collection that attempted the same goals that the quantified movement has. Scientisation plays a major role in legitimizing self-knowledge through self-tracking. As early as 2001, media artists such as Ellie Harrison and Alberto Frigo extensively pioneered the concept, proposing a new direction of labour-intensive self-tracking without using privacy infringing automation.

The term quantified self appears to have been proposed in San Francisco by Wired magazine editors Gary Wolf and Kevin Kelly in 2007 as "a collaboration of users and tool makers who share an interest in self knowledge through self-tracking." In 2010, Wolf spoke about the movement at TED, and in May 2011, the first international conference was held in Mountain View, California. There are conferences in America and Europe. Gary Wolf said "Almost everything we do generates data." Wolf suggests that companies target advertising or recommend products use data from phones, tablets, computers, other technology, and credit cards. However, using the data they make can give people new ways to deal with medical problems, help sleep patterns, and improve diet.

Within the quantified self community, the concept of "personal science" has been developed. It is defined as: "the practice of exploring personally consequential questions by conducting self-directed N-of-1 studies using a structured empirical approach".

Methodologies
Like any empirical study, the primary method is the collection and analysis of data.  In many cases, data are collected automatically using wearable sensors, not limited to, but often worn on the wrist.  In other cases, data may be logged manually.

The data are typically analyzed using traditional techniques such as linear regression to establish correlations among the variables under investigation.  As in every attempt to understand potentially high-dimensional data, visualization techniques can suggest hypotheses that may be tested more rigorously using formal methods.  One simple example of a visualization method is to view the change in some variable over time.

Even though the idea is not new, the technology is.  Technology has made it easier and simpler to gather and analyze personal data. Since these technologies have become smaller and cheaper to be put in smart phones or tablets, it is easier to take the quantitative methods used in science and business and apply them to the personal sphere.

Narratives constitute a symbiotic relationship with large bodies of data. Therefore, quantified self participants are encouraged to share their experiences of self-tracking at various conferences and meetings.

Applications
A major application of quantified self has been in health and wellness improvement. Many devices and services help with tracking physical activity, caloric intake, sleep quality, posture, and other factors involved in personal well-being. Corporate wellness programs, for example, will often encourage some form of tracking. Genetic testing and other services have also become popular.

Quantified self is also being used to improve personal or professional productivity, with tools and services being used to help people keep track of what they do during the workday, where they spend their time, and whom they interact with.

Another application has been in the field of education, where wearable devices are being used in schools so that students can learn more about their own activities and related math and science. Many start-up companies occupy the market right now. Most of them help track data for some type of health pattern, be it sleep or asthma. However, there are bigger companies such as Apple and Google (Fitbit) that occupy some of the space in the market.

A recent movement in quantified self is gamification. There is a wide variety of self-tracking technologies that allow everyday activities to be turned into games by awarding points or monetary value to encourage people to compete with their friends. The success of connected sport is part of the gamification movement. People can pledge a certain amount of real or fake money, or receive awards and trophies.

Many of these self-tracking applications or technologies are compatible with each other and other websites so people can share information with one another. Each technology may integrate with other apps or websites to show a bigger picture of health patterns, goals, and journaling. For example, one may figure out that migraines were more likely to have painful side effects when using a particular migraine drug. Or one can study personal temporal associations between exercise and mood.

The quantified self is also demonstrating to be a major component of "big data science", due to the amount of data that users are collecting on a daily basis. Although these data set streams are not conventional big data, they become sites for data analysis projects, that could be used in medical-related fields to predict health patterns or aide in genomic studies. Examples of studies that have been done using QS data include projects such as the DIYgenomics studies, the Harvard's Personal Genome Project, and the American Gut Microbiome Project.

Quantified baby
Quantified baby is a branch of the quantified self movement that is concerned with collecting extensive data on a baby's daily activities, and using this data to make inferences about behaviour and health. A number of software and hardware products exist to assist data collection by the parent or to collect data automatically for later analysis. Reactions to quantified baby are mixed.

Parents are often told by health professionals to record daily activities about their babies in the first few months, such as feeding times, sleeping times and diaper changes. This is useful for both the parent (used to maintain a schedule and ensure they remain organised) and for the health professional (to make sure the baby is on target and occasionally to assist in diagnosis).

For quantified self, knowledge is power, and knowledge about oneself easily translates as a tool for self-improvement. The aim for many is to use this tracking to ultimately become better parents. Some parents use sleep trackers because they worry about sudden infant death syndrome.

A number of apps exist that have been made for parents wanting to track their baby's daily activities. The most frequently tracked metrics are feeding, sleeping and diaper changes. Mood, activity, medical appointments and milestones are also sometimes covered. Other apps are specifically made for breastfeeding mothers, or those who are pumping their milk to build up a supply for their baby.

Quantified baby, as in quantified self, is associated with a combination of wearable sensors and wearable computing. The synergy of these is related to the concept of the Internet of things.

Debates and criticism 
The quantified self movement has faced some criticism related to the limitations it inherently contains or might pose to other domains. Within these debates, there are some discussions around the nature, responsibility, and outcome of the quantified self movement and its derivative practices. Generally, most bodies of criticism tackle the issue of data exploitation and data privacy but also health literacy skills in the practice of self-tracking. While most of the users engaging in self tracking practices are using the gathered data for self-knowledge and self-improvement, in some cases, self-tracking is pushed and forced by employers onto employees in certain workplace environments, health and life insurers or by substance addiction programs (drug and alcohol monitoring) in order to monitor the physical activity of the subject and analyze the data in order to gather conclusions. Usually the data gathered by this practice of self-tracking can be accessed by commercial, governmental, research and marketing agencies.

The data fetishist critique 
Another recurrent line of debate revolves around "data fetishism". Data fetishism is a phenomenon evolving when active users of self-tracking devices become enticed by the satisfaction and sense of achievement and fulfillment that numerical data offer. Proponents of such lines of criticism tend to claim that data in this sense become simplistic, where complex phenomena become transcribed into reductionist data. This reductionist line of criticism generally incorporates fears and concerns with the ways in which ideas on health are redefined, as well as doctor-patient dynamics and the experience of selfhood among self-trackers. Because of such arguments, the quantified self movement has been criticized for providing predetermined ideals of health, well-being and self-awareness. Rather than increasing the personal skills for self-knowledge, it distances the user from the self by offering an inherently normative and reductionist framework.

An alternative line of criticism still linked to the reductionist discourse but still proposing a more hopeful solution is related the lack of health literacy among most of self-trackers. The European Health Literacy Survey Consortium Health defines health literacy as "[...] people's knowledge, motivations, and competencies to access, understand, appraise, and apply health information in order to make judgements and take decisions in everyday life concerning healthcare, disease prevention and health promotion to maintain or improve quality of life during the life course." Generally, people tend to focus mostly on the data collecting stage, while stages of data archiving, analysis and interpretation are often overlooked because of the skills necessary to conduct such processes, which explains the call for the improvement of health literacy skills among self-quantifiers.

The health literacy critique is different from the data-fetishist critique in its approach to data influence on the human life, health and experience. While the data-fetishist critical discourse ascribes a crucial power of influence to numbers and data, the health literacy critique views gathered data as useless and powerless without the human context and the analysis and reflection skills of the user that are needed to act on the numbers. Datum collection alone is not deterministic or normative, according to the health literacy critique. The "know thy numbers to know thyself" slogan of the quantified self movement is inconsistent, it has been claimed, in the sense that it does not fully acknowledge the need for auxiliary skills of health literacy to actually get to "know thyself". The solution proposed by proponents of the health literacy critique in order to improve the practice of self-tracking and its results is a focus on addressing individual and systemic barriers. The individual barriers are faced by elderly citizens when having to deal with contemporary technology or in cases where there is a need for culturally-sound practices while systemic barriers could be overcome when involving the participation of more health literacy experts and the organization of health literacy education.

See also
 Personal science
 Self-experimentation
 eHealth
 Human enhancement
 Transhumanism
 Experience sampling method

References

Crowdsourcing
Health informatics
Wearable computers
Transhumanism